GIW may refer to:
 Great Indian Warpath, a Native American trail in the United States
 Groton Iron Works, a defunct American shipyard
 White Gelao language